Goose Creek is a  tributary of the Potomac River in Fauquier and Loudoun counties in northern Virginia. It comprises the principal drainage system for the Loudoun Valley.

Course
Goose Creek rises somewhere near the intersection of US 17 and US 50 at Paris,VA. On the east side of the mountain the creek again turns to northeast, joining with the Little River. The creek flows for  through central Loudoun County, reaching the Potomac just east of Leesburg,south of Harrison Island,and west of Selden Island. Goose Creek is partially dammed north of State Route 267. The dammed part is called Goose Creek Reservoir.The dam may be portaged through the woods on the eastern shore.There is also Beaverdam Reservoir,which comes from a source of water called the Beaverdam Creek,which branches off of Goose Creek.

North Fork
The North Fork of Goose Creek rises at the east end of Sleeter Lake in Round Hill and flows  in a southeastward direction, joining with the main branch in the water gap of the Catoctin Mountain.

Conservation
The Goose Creek Association works to protect the watershed and landscape.

Map of Goose Creek
In 1849, construction began on a system of locks and dams to render the creek navigable up to three large mills in the Loudoun Valley on the Little River, North Fork and main creek bed. Across the Potomac from the mouth of a creek, a special lock on the C&O Canal was constructed to allow canal boats from Goose Creek to enter the canal. Due to financial concerns it was decided that the canal would not be built any further upstream. Though the lower portion of the canal saw significant usage, only one boat was ever known to have traveled the whole stretch, and by 1857 the canal was put out of business by the completion of the Alexandria, Loudoun and Hampshire Railroad to Leesburg. Most of the locks and dams were destroyed by the Union Army during the Civil War.

Goose Creek Bridge on the Ashby's Gap Turnpike was the site of a Civil War battle in the Loudoun Valley during the Gettysburg Campaign in 1863. (See Battle of Upperville#Goose Creek for details.) The bridge was built between 1801 and 1803 and is the longest remaining stone turnpike bridge in the state of Virginia.

In The Water Dancer, a slave narrative style novel by Ta-Nehisi Coats, the Goose serves as both a water symbol and the geographic location of the fictionalized tobacco farm, Lockless, Virginia.

Tributaries

Tributaries are listed in order from the source of Goose Creek to its mouth.
 Mitchell's Branch
 Bolling Branch
 Gap Run
 Panther Skin Creek
 Cromwell's Run
 Wancopin Creek
 North Fork Goose Creek
 Jacks' Run
 Crooked Run
 Beaverdam Creek
 Big Branch
 Little River
 Tan Branch
 Black Branch
 Beaver Dam Creek
 Sycolin Creek
 Tuscarora Creek
 Dry Mill Branch
 Cattail Branch

Variant names
According to the Geographic Names Information System, Goose Creek has been known by the following names throughout its history:
 Cokongoloto 	
 Cokongoloto Anglice 	
 Goes Creek 	
 Goes Flug 	
 Gohongarestaw
 Gooscreek 	
 Goose River 	
 Lee's Creek 	
 Tiber River

See also
List of rivers of Virginia

References

External links

Rivers of Loudoun County, Virginia
Rivers of Fauquier County, Virginia
Rivers of Virginia
Tributaries of the Potomac River